A Hell of a Day (original title: Reines d'un jour) is a 2001 French comedy film directed by Marion Vernoux.

Cast

 Karin Viard : Hortense Lassalle
 Hélène Fillières : Marie Larue
 Victor Lanoux : Maurice Degombert
 Jane Birkin : Jane
 Sergi López : Luis Del Sol
 Clémentine Célarié : Michèle
 Gilbert Melki : Shermann
 Melvil Poupaud : Ben
 Jonathan Zaccaï : Pierre
 Valérie Benguigui : Stéphanie
 Philippe Harel : Antoine Lassalle
 Evelyne Buyle : Evelyne
 Joseph Malerba : Marco
 Michèle Moretti : The bus passenger
 Catherine Hosmalin : The cockroaches woman

Accolades

References

External links

2001 films
French comedy films
2000s French-language films
2001 comedy films
Films directed by Marion Vernoux
2000s French films